There are at least 10 named lakes and reservoirs in Wheatland County, Montana.

Lakes
 Elk Lake, el.

Reservoirs
 Deadmans Basin Reservoir, el. 
 Fox Reservoir, el. 
 Jellison Reservoir, el. 
 Lebo Lake, el. 
 Lode Reservoir, el. 
 Martin and C Bar J Reservoir, el. 
 Martinsdale Reservoir, el. 
 Middle Fork Reservoir, el. 
 Nelson Reservoir, el.

See also
 List of lakes in Montana

Notes

Bodies of water of Wheatland County, Montana
Wheatland